Physopella is a genus of fungal plant pathogen in the family Phakopsoraceae.

Edwin Mains described the genus Angiopsora in 1934, but it was reduced to synonymy in 1958, as Joseph Charles Arthur had already described the genus as Physopella in 1906. In 1992, Angiopsora was moved to synonymy with Phakopsora.

References

External links 
 Index Fungorum

Fungal plant pathogens and diseases
Teliomycotina